Lower Padworth is a hamlet in Berkshire, and part of the civil parishes of Padworth, Aldermaston and Beenham. According to the Post Office at the 2011 Census the majority of the population was included in the civil parish of Padworth.

The settlement lies on the A4 road, and is located near to Aldermaston railway station.

Hamlets in Berkshire
West Berkshire District